Seyed Hossein Mir-Moezi is an Iranian cleric and economist and associate professor of Islamic economics at the Research Institute for Islamic Culture and Thought. He is known for his works on Islamic economics.

Awards
He is a recipient of the Iranian Book of the Year Award for his book titled Riba: Riba's History, Riba in Koran and Sunnah, Varieties of Riba and its Escape Routes.

Works
 Islamic Economic System
 Riba: Riba's History, Riba in Koran and Sunnah, Varieties of Riba and its Escape Routes
 Money and Monetary Systems
 Islam and Economic Challenges
 Macroeconomics: An Islamic Perspective
 Philosophy of Economics 
 Beiʼol khiar from the viewpoint of Islamic jurisprudence and economics

References

External links
 Mir-Moezi at the Research Institute for Islamic Culture and Thought

Living people
Iranian economists
Academic staff of the Research Institute for Islamic Culture and Thought
Year of birth missing (living people)